Balik Kampung (English: "return to village") is a Malay term used in Malaysia, Singapore and Brunei for the massive exodus during festive seasons such as Hari Raya Aidilfitri, Deepavali and Chinese New Year. During this time, migrants or migrant workers return to their hometown or village.

In Indonesia, it is known as Pulang Kampung or Mudik.

In popular culture
Balik Kampung, a 1986 Malay film 
Balik Kampung, a song by Malaysian singer Sudirman Arshad
Lời tỏ tình dễ thương 2- Vietnanese version by Vietnamese  singer Ngọc Sơn from Sudirman Arshad's song (Balik Kampung) 

Malaysian culture
Singaporean culture
Seasonal traditions
Holidays